A Trick of the Light is a book written by Louise Penny and published by Minotaur Books (owned by St. Martin's Press, an imprint of Macmillan Publishers) on 30 August 2011, which later went on to win the Anthony Award for Best Novel in 2012.

Synopsis 
The body of a childhood friend of Clara Morrow, someone she supposedly hasn't seen in years, is found dead in her garden after a party.  The murder is investigated by Armand Gamache.

References 

2011 Canadian novels
Novels by Louise Penny
Anthony Award-winning works
Novels about alcoholism
Minotaur Books books